Wide Wide World may refer to:

Wide Wide World, American documentary series airing from 1955 to 1958 on NBC
The Wide, Wide World, 1850 American  novel by Susan Warner, published under the pseudonym Elizabeth Wetherell

See also
Whole Wide World (disambiguation)
Wide World